Live at the Blue Note is an album by jazz musician Dave Valentin.  It was released in 1988. The album features Bill O'Connell (Kawai Electric Piano and Yamaha DX7), Lincoln Goines (bass), Robert Ameen (drums), and Giovanni Hidalgo (percussion and congas).

Track listing
"Cinnamon & Clove"
"Columbus Avenue"
"Footprints"
"Mountain Song"
"Marcosinho"
"Blackbird"
"Monkey Buttons"
"Dansette"
"Afro Blue"

Production 

 Recorded live at the Blue Note, New York City on May 31 and June 1, 1988.

References

Dave Valentin albums
1988 live albums
GRP Records live albums
Albums recorded at the Blue Note Jazz Club